Aplasia cutis-myopia syndrome is a rare genetic disorder characterized by a combination of aplasia cutis congenita, high myopia, and dysfunction of the cone-rods. Other findings include congenital nystagmus, atrophy of the iris and pigment epithelium, easily scarred skin and keratoconus. Only 4 cases (from the United Kingdom and Israel, respectively) have been described in medical literature. Transmission is either autosomal dominant or autosomal recessive.

References 

Rare genetic syndromes
Syndromes affecting the eye